, also known as , was a  Japanese castle in Mutsu Province. Located in modern-day Izumi-ku, Miyagi Prefecture, the castle belonged to the Kokubu clan, which ruled the area before the entry of the Date clan. Matsumoridate was also known as Flying Crane Castle (Tsuru-ga-jō 鶴ヶ城), because of its similarity in appearance to the spread wings of a flying crane.  The last lord of the castle was Kokubu Morishige. After the entry of the Date clan, the castle was largely dismantled and became the traditional grounds for the Date clan's new year's falconry trips.

Notes

Buildings and structures in Sendai
Castles in Miyagi Prefecture
Former castles in Japan
Ruined castles in Japan